This article lists the mountains of Corsica by height and by prominence.

Corsica contains seven massifs: Monte Cinto massif, Monte Rotondo massif, Monte Renoso massif, Monte Incudine massif, Monte San Petrone massif, Monte Astu massif, and Monte Stello massif.

References